The Clinton House is a historic building located in downtown Ithaca, New York. It is built primarily in the Greek Revival style, common in older buildings in Ithaca. It currently houses offices and a local charter school. It is directly adjacent to the Ithaca Commons.

History
The Clinton House was originally built in 1828–1829 as an upscale hotel and Ithaca's first professional office building, with 150 rooms, an immense undertaking for the then 4,000-strong population of Ithaca. It was named for DeWitt Clinton, governor of New York from 1817 to 1822 and again from 1824 to 1827.

Upon its opening Clinton House was reputed to be "the most imposing hotel" between New York and Buffalo.

At least four U.S. presidents have stayed in its rooms, as well as numerous film actors from Ithaca's brief heyday as a center for the film industry. 
The Clinton House was built in 1831, which was during the Greek Revival Stage of America (1820–1860). The columns out front and the enormous windows and doors are sure signs of the style. 
Today, The Clinton house houses many business offices and the New Roots Charter School.

See also 
 List of Registered Historic Places in New York
 List of places named for DeWitt Clinton

References

External links 
Historic Ithaca Buildings

Buildings and structures in Ithaca, New York
Hotel buildings on the National Register of Historic Places in New York (state)
Office buildings on the National Register of Historic Places in New York (state)
Historic American Buildings Survey in New York (state)
Hotel buildings completed in 1829
Hotels established in 1828
National Register of Historic Places in Tompkins County, New York